Duration neglect is the psychological observation that people's judgments of the unpleasantness of painful experiences depend very little on the duration of those experiences. Multiple experiments have found that these judgments tend to be affected by two factors: the peak (when the experience was the most painful) and how quickly the pain diminishes. If it diminishes more slowly, the experience is judged to be less painful. Hence, the term "peak–end rule" describes this process of evaluation.

Duration neglect is a specific form of the more general extension neglect.

Boundaries 
Duration neglect appears to be limited to unfamiliar experiences. When research participants evaluate experiences with which they are or made familiar, such as a telephone ringing or their regular commute, they appear to be sensitive to the duration of experiences. Similarly, providing participants with a modulus (i.e., a standard of comparison) by which to evaluate the duration of events, also makes them sensitive to duration.

Examples 
In one study, Daniel Kahneman and Barbara Fredrickson showed subjects pleasant or aversive film clips. When reviewing the clips mentally at a later time, subjects did not appear to take the length of the stimuli into account, instead judging them as if they were only a series of affective "snapshots".

In another demonstration, Kahneman and Fredrickson with other collaborators had subjects place their hands in painfully cold water. Under one set of instructions, they had to keep their hand in the water for an additional 30 seconds as the water was slowly heated to a warmer but still uncomfortably cold level, and under another set of instructions they were to remove their hand immediately. Otherwise, both experiences were the same. Most subjects chose to repeat the longer experience. Subjects apparently judged the experience according to the peak–end rule (in other words, according to its worst and final moments only), paying little attention to duration.

Duration neglect can be observed in medicine, as it may lead patients to be inaccurate when judging whether their symptoms are improving with treatment.

Debiasing

Some forms of duration neglect may be reduced or eliminated by having participants answer in graphical format, or give a rating for every five minutes. Duration neglect is a subtype of extension neglect and a component of affective forecasting.

See also 
 Cognitive bias
 Peak-end rule

References 

Cognitive biases